Doubtful River may refer to:
Doubtful River (New South Wales), Australia, a tributary of Tumut River
Doubtful River (New Zealand), New Zealand, a tributary of Boyle River